The Birchall Peaks are a group of peaks  west of Mount Iphigene, on the south side of Block Bay in Marie Byrd Land. They were discovered in 1929 by the Byrd Antarctic Expedition, and were named by Richard E. Byrd for Frederick T. Birchall, a member of the staff of The New York Times which published the expedition's press dispatches.

References 

Mountains of Marie Byrd Land